Labetuzumab (marketed under the trade name CEA-CIDE) is a humanized IgG1 monoclonal antibody for the treatment of colorectal cancer. It selectively binds to carcinoembryonic cell adhesion molecule 5. 

Also tried in patients with MTC (medullary thyroid carcinoma) with metastasis.

This drug was developed by Immunomedics, Inc.

References

Monoclonal antibodies for tumors